Sillim Station is a station on Seoul Subway Line 2 and Sillim Line. It is located in Sillim-dong, Gwanak-gu, Seoul.

Station layout

Vicinity
The Sillim area is a crowded area because of many shopping malls and restaurants. Sundae chon is famous among residents. Renaissance shopping mall is located nearby, which sells articles from men's clothes to accessories. Restaurants like Lotteria, Hans Deli, as well as Krispy Kreme are also popular and close to the station.  Seoul National University and Soongsil University are not far from here.

Passenger load
In a survey conducted in 2011 by the Ministry of Land, Transport and Maritime Affairs on 92 Administrative divisions across the country, it reported that Sillim Station is the fifth busiest public transit stop following Gangnam Station, Jamsil Station, Sadang Station and Seolleung Station.

References

Railway stations opened in 1984
Seoul Metropolitan Subway stations
Metro stations in Gwanak District
1984 establishments in South Korea
20th-century architecture in South Korea